USS Waxbill may refer to: 

 , a wooden-hulled purse seiner built in 1936
 , laid down as PCS-1456 on 28 April 1943
 USS Waxbill (AM-414), which was to be built in 1945, but the contract was canceled.

United States Navy ship names